is a Japanese composer, performer and researcher.

Biography
Namba was born in Hamamatsu. He studied at Toho College of Music. He studied with Kazuaki Ogikubo, Jun Nagao, Tomiko Kohjiba, Carlo Forlivesi and René Staar. His works have been performed by many players not only in Japan, but also in Vienna and Kosovo. He received various prizes at national and international competitions including Japan national composition competition iic Tokyo 2008 (first prize, organized by the Istituto Italiano di Cultura Tokyo in 2008), Tōru Takemitsu Composition Award (2nd prize, organized by the Tokyo Opera City Cultural Foundation in 2010) and his selected to the finalist of UNIQUE FORMS OF CONTINUITY IN SPACE INTERNATIONALCOMPOSITION COMPETITION 2010 (organized by the Italian Institute of Culture, Melbourne in 2010).

He is a lecturer at the Toho College of Music.

References

External links
 Ken Namba Official Website
  Toru Takemitsu Composition Award 2010

1983 births
21st-century classical composers
21st-century Japanese composers
Electroacoustic music composers
Japanese ethnomusicologists
Japanese classical composers
Japanese male classical composers
Living people
Musicians from Shizuoka Prefecture
People from Hamamatsu
Postmodern composers
21st-century Japanese male musicians